McLaury is a surname. Notable people with the surname include:

Frank McLaury (1849–1881), American gunslinger
Tom McLaury (1853–1881), American gunslinger